Elissa Down is an Australian filmmaker, who in 1999 and 2000, was nominated for Young Film-maker of the year at the WA Screen Awards.

Her major works are a number of award-winning short films, Summer Angst, The Cherry Orchard, Her Outback, The Bathers, Pink Pyjamas, HMAS Unicorn and Samantha Stewart, aged fourteen. They have been screened at numerous festivals including Tampere, Locarno Aix-en-Provence, Montecatini, Milan, San Francisco Indie, St Kilda, Brisbane, Revelation, Women on Women, POV and Tropfest. These shorts have also been screened in theatres and broadcast nationally and overseas. Down was one of Australia's upcoming artists featured in the In Progress spread in Vogue (2005).

Down's first feature film, the semi-autobiographical, The Black Balloon was released in Australian cinemas 6 March 2008. It stars Rhys Wakefield, Gemma Ward, Luke Ford, Erik Thomson and Academy Award Nominee Toni Collette. The film was partially based on herself and family. The world premiere was at the Berlin International Film Festival in Germany in February 2008, where the film received a Crystal Bear as the best feature-length film in the Generation 14plus category.  On 6 December 2008 Down was awarded the AFI Best Direction in Film Award and AFI Best Original Screenplay Award for the Black Balloon. The film also won the L'Oreal Paris AFI Award for Best FIlm.

Down's other feature film directing credits include The Honor List (2018), starring Meghan Rienks and Sasha Pieterse and Feel the Beat (2020) starring Sofia Carson.

Awards
 The Black Balloon Winner Best Feature Film - Berlin International Film Festival, Generation 14+ section, 2008
 Summer Angst Winner Best Actor Female – Tropfest, 2004
 The Bathers Winner Grand Prix Split International Festival of New Film, 2003
 The Bathers Winner Best Fiction Montecatini International Short Film Festival, 2003
 The Bathers Special Mention Youth Jury – Locarno International Film Festival, 2002
 Her Outback Winner - State ACS Award (Gold) for Cinematography in a short documentary, 2002
 Her Outback Winner Best Director and Best Cinematographer - Kaleidoscope Short Film Festival, 2002
 Samantha Stewart, aged fourteen Winner Best Drama and Best Editing - WA Screen Awards, 2001
 Samantha Stewart, aged fourteen Commended at the DENDY Awards for the under 15 minutes fiction category, 2001

References

External links
 
 
 FFC letter of intent reaches WA filmmakers
 FTO news about The Black Balloon
 ICON Entertainment page about The Black Balloon

Australian film directors
Place of birth missing (living people)
Year of birth missing (living people)
Australian women film directors
Living people
Curtin University alumni
Australian women screenwriters
20th-century Australian screenwriters
20th-century Australian women writers
21st-century Australian screenwriters
21st-century Australian women writers